Scythris kruegeri is a moth of the family Scythrididae. It was described by Bengt Å. Bengtsson in 2014. It is found in South Africa (Northern Cape).

References

Endemic moths of South Africa
kruegeri
Moths described in 2014